Epidendrum campestre, the savannah epidendrum, is a rupicolous, sympodial orchid of the genus Epidendrum, with claviculate pseudobulbs up to  tall, which bear three narrow leathery linear-lanceolate leaves up to  in length. The inflorescence arises from the apex of the pseudobulb, and bears up to ten flowers in the spring. The tetralobate lip is adnate to the column to its end, lacks any fringe whatsoever, and has a white callus.

References

External links 

 The Internet Orchid Species Photo Encyclopedia
 Orchidstudium

campestre